János Dévai (9 January 1940 – 11 September 2006) was a Hungarian cyclist. He competed in the individual road race at the 1960 Summer Olympics.

References

External links
 

1940 births
2006 deaths
Hungarian male cyclists
Olympic cyclists of Hungary
Cyclists at the 1960 Summer Olympics
Sportspeople from Pécs